Dave Gross is a game designer who has worked primarily on role-playing games.

He is also a magazine editor, and has held the position of Editor-in-Chief at Star Wars Insider and at Amazing Stories.

Career
Dave Gross, Michael Mikaelian, and Vic Wertz oversaw Star Wars Insider after Paizo Publishing gained the license from Wizards of the Coast in 2002. Paizo kicked off their Pathfinder Tales line with Prince of Wolves (2010) by Gross.

Gross joined the team at Beamdog as lead writer for Baldur's Gate: Enhanced Edition in 2012.

His novels include Forgotten Realms: Black Wolf (2001), and Lord of Stormweather (2003).

References

External links
 Home page
 

American male novelists
Dungeons & Dragons game designers
Living people
Place of birth missing (living people)
Year of birth missing (living people)